Switzerland competed at the 2022 World Aquatics Championships in Budapest, Hungary from 18 June to 3 July.

Artistic swimming 

Switzerland entered 12 artistic swimmers.

Women

Diving

Switzerland entered 4 divers.

Men

Women

Mixed

Swimming

Switzerland entered 7 swimmers.
Men

Women

References

Nations at the 2022 World Aquatics Championships
2022
World Aquatics Championships